Ham is pork from a leg cut that has been preserved by wet or dry curing, with or without smoking. As a processed meat, the term "ham" includes both whole cuts of meat and ones that have been mechanically formed.

Ham is made around the world, including a number of regional specialties, such as Westphalian ham and some varieties of Spanish jamón. In addition, numerous ham products have specific geographical naming protection, such as prosciutto di Parma in Europe, and Smithfield ham in the US.

History 
The preserving of pork leg as ham has a long history, with traces of production of cured ham among the Etruscan civilization known in the 6th and 5th century BC.

Cato the Elder wrote about the "salting of hams" in his  tome around 160 BC.

There are claims that the Chinese were the first people to mention the production of cured ham.  claims an origin from Gaul. It was certainly well established by the Roman period, as evidenced by an import trade from Gaul mentioned by Marcus Terentius Varro in his writings.

The modern word "ham" is derived from the Old English  or  meaning the hollow or bend of the knee, from a Germanic base where it meant "crooked". It began to refer to the cut of pork derived from the hind leg of a pig around the 15th century.

Because of the preservation process, ham is a compound foodstuff or ingredient, being made up of the original meat, as well as the remnants of the preserving agent(s), such as salt, but it is still recognised as a food in its own right.

Methods 
Ham is produced by curing raw pork by salting, also known as dry curing, or brining, also known as wet curing. Additionally, smoking may be employed, and seasonings may be added.

Dry-cured 

Traditional dry cure hams may use only salt as the curative agent, such as with San Daniele or Parma hams, although this is comparatively rare. This process involves cleaning the raw meat, covering it in salt while it is gradually pressed draining all the blood. Specific herbs and spices may be used to add flavour during this step. The hams are then washed and hung in a dark, temperature-regulated place until dry. It is then hung to air for another period of time.

The duration of the curing process varies by the type of ham. For example, Jinhua ham takes approximately 8 to 10 months to complete, Serrano ham cures in 9–12 months, Parma ham takes more than 12 months, and Iberian ham can take up to 2 years to reach the desired flavor characteristics.

Most modern dry cure hams also use nitrites (either sodium nitrite or potassium nitrite), which are added along with the salt. Nitrites are used because they prevent bacterial growth and, in a reaction with the meat's myoglobin, give the product a desirable dark red color. The amount and mixture of salt and nitrites used have an effect on the shrinkage of the meat. Because of the toxicity of nitrite, some areas specify a maximum allowable content of nitrite in the final product. Under certain conditions, especially during cooking, nitrites in meat can react with degradation products of amino acids, forming nitrosamines, which are known carcinogens.

The dry curing of ham involves a number of enzymatic reactions. The enzymes involved are proteinases (cathepsins – B, D, H & L, and calpains) and exopeptidases (peptidase and aminopeptidase). These enzymes cause proteolysis of muscle tissue, which creates large numbers of small peptides and free amino acids, while the adipose tissue undergoes lipolysis to create free fatty acids. Salt and phosphates act as strong inhibitors of proteolytic activity. Animal factors influencing enzymatic activity include age, weight, and breed. During the process itself, conditions such as temperature, duration, water content, redox potential, and salt content all have an effect on the meat.

The salt content in dry-cured ham varies throughout a piece of meat, with gradients determinable through sampling and testing or non-invasively through CT scanning.

Dry-cured ham is usually eaten without being cooked.

Wet-cured 
Wet-cured hams are brined, which involves the immersion of the meat in a brine, sometimes with other ingredients such as sugar also added for flavour. The meat is typically kept in the brine for around 3 to 14 days. Wet curing also has the effect of increasing volume and weight of the finished product, by about 4%.

The wet curing process can also be achieved by pumping the curing solution into the meat. This can be quicker, increase the weight of the finished product by more than immersion, and ensure a more even distribution of salt through the meat. This process is quicker than traditional brining, normally being completed in a few days.

Wet-cured ham is usually cooked, either during processing, or after ageing.

The Italian version of cooked, wet-cured ham is called prosciutto cotto, as are similar hams made outside Italy. It is first brined, then cooked in a container and finally surface pasteurized. Italian regulations allow it to contain salt, nitrites, sugar, dextrose, fructose, lactose, maltodextrin, milk protein, soy protein, natural or modified starches, spices, gelatin, and flavorings.

Smoking 
Ham can also be additionally preserved through smoking, in which the meat is placed in a smokehouse (or equivalent) to be cured by the action of smoke.

The main flavor compounds of smoked ham are guaiacol, and its 4-, 5-, and 6-methyl derivatives as well as 2,6-dimethylphenol. These compounds are produced by combustion of lignin, a major constituent of wood used in the smokehouse.

Labeling 

In many countries the term is now protected by statute, with a specific definition. For instance, in the United States, the Code of Federal Regulations (CFR) says that "the word 'ham', without any prefix indicating the species of animal from which derived, shall be used in labeling only in connection with the hind legs of swine".

In addition to the main categories, some processing choices can affect legal labeling. For instance, in the United States, a "smoked" ham must have been smoked by hanging over burning wood chips in a smokehouse or an atomized spray of liquid smoke such that the product appearance is equivalent; a "hickory-smoked" ham must have been smoked using only hickory. However, injecting "smoke flavor" is not legal grounds for claiming the ham was "smoked"; these are labeled "smoke flavor added". Hams can only be labeled "honey-cured" if honey was at least 50% of the sweetener used, is at least 3% of the formula, and has a discernible effect on flavor. So-called "lean" and "extra lean" hams must adhere to maximum levels of fat and cholesterol per 100 grams of product.

Whole fresh pork leg can be labeled as fresh ham in the United States.

Protected designations 
A number of hams worldwide have some level of protection of their unique characteristics, usually relating to their method of preservation or location of production or processing. Dependent on jurisdiction, rules may prevent any other product being sold with the particular appellation, such as through the European protected geographical indication.

Belgium
Jambon d'Ardenne – Wallonia

Bulgaria
Elenski but – Elena

China
Anfu ham- Jiangxi
Jinhua ham – Jinhua
Rugao ham – Rugao
Xuanwei ham – Xuanwei

Czech Republic
Pražká Šunka ("Prague Ham") – Prague

Croatia
Pršut

France
Bayonne ham (Jambon de Bayonne) – Bayonne

Germany
Ammerländer Schinken – Ammerland
Schwarzwälder Schinken – Black Forest
Westfälischer Schinken – Westphalia

Italy
Prosciutto di Parma – Parma
Prosciutto di San Daniele – San Daniele del Friuli
Speck Alto Adige – South Tyrol
Vallée d’Aoste Jambon de Bosses – Saint-Rhémy-en-Bosses, Aosta Valley

Luxembourg
Éisleker ham – Oesling region

Montenegro
Njeguška pršuta – Njeguši, Montenegro

Portugal
Portuguese Fiambre (not to be confused with Guatemalan fiambre)
Presunto
Jamón Ibérico

Slovenia
Kraški pršut

Spain
 Jamón serrano
 Jamón Ibérico, made from the Black Iberian pig breeds.
 Lacón Gallego, from Galicia

United Kingdom
Wiltshire cure ham

United States
Smithfield ham – Smithfield, Virginia

Uses 

Ham is typically used in its sliced form, often as a filling for sandwiches and similar foods, such as in the ham sandwich and ham and cheese sandwich. Other variations include toasted sandwiches such as the croque-monsieur and the Cubano. It is also a popular topping for pizza in the United States.

In the United Kingdom, a pork leg cut, either whole or sliced, that has been cured but requires additional cooking is known as gammon. Gammons were traditionally cured before being cut from a side of pork along with bacon. When cooked, gammon is ham. Such roasts are a traditional part of British Christmas dinners.

Health effects 
As a processed meat, there has been concern over the health effects of ham consumption.

This supported earlier studies, including the 2007 study "Food, Nutrition, Physical Activity and the Prevention of Cancer: a Global Perspective", by the World Cancer Research Fund and the American Institute for Cancer Research, which reviewed more than 7,000 studies published worldwide. Among the recommendations was that, except for very rare occasions, people should avoid eating ham or other processed meats – cured, smoked, salted or chemically preserved meat products such as bacon, hot dogs, sausage, salami, and pastrami. The report states that once an individual reaches the  weekly limit for red meat, every  of processed meat consumed a day increases cancer risk by 21%.

See also 
 Christmas ham
 Ham and eggs
 List of ham dishes
 List of hams
 List of smoked foods
 Spam
 Turkey ham

References

External links 

 Ham history 
 Ham and food safety at the United States Department of Agriculture
 The Cook's Thesaurus: "ham"

 
Ancient dishes
Charcuterie
Lunch meat
Garde manger
Smoked meat
Thanksgiving food